Steven Tepper is a cultural sociologist and the Dean and Director of the Herberger Institute for Design and the Arts at Arizona State University.

He was an early architect of the field of cultural policy studies, serving as the deputy director of the Princeton University Center for Arts and Cultural Policy Studies and then as associate director of the Curb Center for Art, Enterprise and Public Policy at Vanderbilt University. Tepper served on the steering committee that helped launch the Creative Campus movement  and gave it broad visibility in 2004 with his cover story for the Chronicle of Higher Education, “The Creative Campus: Who’s Number 1?”.  His views about creativity and education, creative work and cultural policy have been covered widely in higher education and the national press.

Education 
Tepper holds a bachelor's degree from the University of North Carolina at Chapel Hill (1989), where he served as senior class president. He also holds a masters in public policy from Harvard University’s Kennedy School of Government (1996) and a PhD in sociology from Princeton University (2001).

Career 
After graduating from the University of North Carolina at Chapel Hill, Chancellor Paul Hardin appointed Tepper in 1990 to serve as the executive director of the University’s Bicentennial Observance (1993-1994); an 8-month celebration of the nation’s first public university to open its doors.  The Observance featured more than 120 events across the state of North Carolina, including a kick off event at UNC’s Kenan Stadium featuring a keynote address by President Bill Clinton (October 12, 1993).

While pursuing his PhD at Princeton University, Steven Tepper helped launch the Center for Arts and Cultural Policy Studies, serving as associate and then deputy director from 1998 to 2004. and working directly with Center faculty directors Paul DiMaggio and Stan Katz. The Princeton University Center was one of the first cultural policy centers at a US university and the first embedded in a policy school.

In 2004, Tepper joined former National Endowment for the Arts Chairman Bill Ivey at Vanderbilt University to launch another national policy center focused on arts and culture – The Curb Center for Art, Enterprise and Public Policy.  While at Vanderbilt University, Tepper served as associate director of the Curb Center, assistant and associate professor of sociology, and co-chair, with Mel Zeigler, of the Vanderbilt Creative Campus Taskforce. He also served as lead facilitator for Leadership Music in Nashville, TN from 2012-2014, a leadership and professional development program for music executives and artists. Tepper launched the Strategic National Alumni Project (SNAAP) with initial support from the Surdna Foundation, serving as SNAAP’s first research director from 2006 to 2018. SNAAP is the largest survey ever conducted of arts and design graduates, with more than 200,000 survey respondents to date. Tepper's work on creative graduates has challenged the "starving artist" myth and has been covered widely.

In 2014, Tepper joined Arizona State University as Dean and Director of the Herberger Institute for Design and the Arts, the national largest comprehensive design and arts college at a research university. Tepper created a new film school in 2019 and secured permission from legendary actor Sidney Poitier and his family in 2021 to name the school the Sidney Poitier New American Film School. Under Tepper's leadership, the Institute has expanded from Tempe, AZ into 3 additional cities with state-of-the-art facilities in downtown Phoenix (Fusion on First), downtown Mesa (MIX Center), and downtown LA (ASU California Center). The Media and Immersive Experience Center (MIX) opened in August 2022.

Academic Work 
Tepper’s research focuses on creativity, higher education, creative work and careers, cultural policy and cultural conflict.  He has written and spoken extensively about creativity in higher education and has been featured in the Chronicle of Higher Education, Inside Higher Education, Fast Company, and the Huffington Post. In 2011, he was interviewed by Jeffrey Brown on PBS NewHour to discuss his research on cultural conflict.

He is author of two books: Not Here, Not Now, Not That: Protest over Art and Culture in American Cities (2011, University of Chicago Press),  and Engaging Art, The Next Great Transformation of America’s Cultural Life. Co-edited with William Ivey (2007, Routledge).

Honors and Recognition 
Tepper was appointed to the American Academy for Arts and Sciences’ National Commission on the Arts (2019-2021) and serves on the board of the National Humanities Alliance (2021–present). He was named Leader of the Year in Public Policy in 2016 by the Arizona Capitol Times. He was awarded the 2019 Full Circle Award for making transformational change for youth.

References

American sociologists
University of North Carolina at Chapel Hill alumni
Harvard Kennedy School alumni
Princeton University alumni
Arizona State University faculty
Vanderbilt University faculty
Living people
1967 births